Trigonopterus baliensis is a species of flightless weevil in the genus Trigonopterus from Indonesia.

Etymology
The specific name is derived from the type locality of Bali.

Description
Individuals measure 1.46–1.90 mm long.  General coloration is black, with rust-colored markings on the elytra.  The legs and head are rust-colored.

Range

Phylogeny
T. baliensis is part of the T. relictus species group.

References

baliensis
Beetles described in 2014
Beetles of Asia